Thelypodiopsis aurea, the Durango tumblemustard or Durango tumble-mustard, is a species of mustard native to Arizona, Colorado, New Mexico, and Utah. This species is restricted to the Four Corners area and is only present in Apache County in Arizona, Montezuma County in Colorado, Sandoval & San Juan Counties in New Mexico, and San Juan County in Utah.

Description 
A biennial or short-lived perennial from a taproot, glabrous or rarely sparsely pubescent with simple hairs at the stem base. Leaves are somewhat fleshy. Inflorescence an elongating fruit. Flower petals yellow, and fruit is a silique on stipes 2-8 mm long. Seeds are oblong. Flowering occurs from April to May. The plant can reach up to 3 ft. tall.

From a distance, this can be mistaken for Stanleya pinnata but up-close the two are distinct.

Distribution 
Thelypodiopsis aurea is endemic to the Four Corners Region. They can be found near ledges, alkalai flats, clay flats & hills, desert shrub, Pinon-Juniper, badlands, saltbush communities. Ranging from 4,800 ft. to 6,900 ft. in elevation.

References

External links 

Brassicaceae